Lone Tree Creek is a tributary stream of the San Joaquin River now diverted, in San Joaquin County, California.

References 

Tributaries of the San Joaquin River